Septin 14 is a protein that in humans is encoded by the SEPT14 gene.

Function 

SEPT14 is a member of the highly conserved septin family of GTP-binding cytoskeletal proteins implicated in membrane transport, apoptosis, cell polarity, cell cycle regulation, cytokinesis, and other cellular functions.

References

Further reading